Spring is the first extended play (EP) by American band Wallows. It was released on April 6, 2018 through Atlantic Records.

Background 
On February 23, 2018, Wallows released the album's first single "Pictures of Girls"; a subsequent music video was released the same day. The album's second single "These Days" was released on March 23, 2018. On June 25, 2018, a music video for "These Days" was released and is currently the second most popular video on the Wallows YouTube channel.

Track listing 
All tracks are written by Dylan Minnette, Cole Preston, and Braeden Lemasters. Any additional writers are noted under "Writer(s)".

Track title and length adopted from Apple Music.

References 

2018 EPs
Wallows albums
Atlantic Records EPs

Albums produced by John Congleton